Stereostoma is a genus of beetles in the family Carabidae, containing the following species:

 Stereostoma angolense G.Muller, 1940
 Stereostoma balbisi G.Muller, 1940
 Stereostoma camerunum G.Muller, 1940
 Stereostoma clarkei Straneo, 1979
 Stereostoma conradti G.Muller, 1940
 Stereostoma corpulentum Chaudoir, 1872
 Stereostoma ertli G.Muller, 1940
 Stereostoma erythraeum G.Muller, 1940
 Stereostoma girardi Straneo, 1986
 Stereostoma guineense G.Muller, 1940
 Stereostoma hirtipenne G.Muller, 1940
 Stereostoma incisum Straneo, 1991
 Stereostoma ingens G.Muller, 1940
 Stereostoma interstitiale Straneo, 1979
 Stereostoma jeanneli Alluaud, 1933
 Stereostoma kuntzeni G.Muller, 1940
 Stereostoma praecellens G.Muller, 1941
 Stereostoma rhodesianum Straneo, 1947
 Stereostoma sansibaricum G.Muller, 1940
 Stereostoma senegalense G.Muller, 1940
 Stereostoma titschacki G.Muller, 1940
 Stereostoma usambaricum G.Muller, 1940
 Stereostoma punctatum Straneo, 1958
 Stereostoma punctisternum Straneo, 1951
 Stereostoma solidum Murray, 1857
 Stereostoma stuhlmanni Kolbe, 1896
 Stereostoma tenebrioides (J.Thomson, 1858)
 Stereostoma whitei Murray, 1857

References

Pterostichinae